Weissia levieri is a species of moss in the Pottiaceae family.

Distribution 
Weissia levieri is known from Eurasia and the Maghreb of North-Africa.

References 

Pottiaceae